The Somerset micropolitan area may refer to:

The Somerset, Pennsylvania micropolitan area, United States
The Somerset, Kentucky micropolitan area, United States

See also
Somerset (disambiguation)